The Vercelli–Pavia railway is a railway line between Piedmont and Lombardy, in Italy. It was opened in 1882–1883.

See also 
 List of railway lines in Italy

References

Footnotes

Sources
 
 

Railway lines in Lombardy
Railway lines in Piedmont
Railway lines opened in 1883